Michael Gerard Tune (born 28 February 1962) is an English former professional footballer who played in the Football League for Crewe Alexandra.

Career
Tune was born in Stoke-on-Trent and began his career with Stoke City. He failed to break into the first team at Stoke and joined Fourth Division side Crewe Alexandra in 1979 where he made one appearance which came in a 4–0 defeat away at Bradford City on 18 August 1979.

Career statistics
Source:

References

1962 births
Living people
English footballers
Association football midfielders
English Football League players
Stoke City F.C. players
Crewe Alexandra F.C. players
Macclesfield Town F.C. players